Delsatia  is an early mammaliaform genus that lived during the Late Triassic and has been found in France. The type species, D. rhupotopi, was named in 1997. It was originally tentatively placed within the Docodonta, but subsequent studies disagree with this; Delsatia is seen by most as a basal mammaliaform. The holotype, MNHN.F.SNP408W, is an incomplete, isolated tooth.

References

Prehistoric mammaliaforms
Prehistoric cynodont genera
Late Triassic synapsids of Europe
Triassic France
Fossils of France
Fossil taxa described in 1997
Taxa named by Pascal Godefroit
Taxa named by Denise Sigogneau‐Russell